The Pyeatte Mill Site is a roadside park encompassing the remains of a historic early 20th-century mill facility on Arkansas Highway 45 in Canehill, Arkansas.  The principal surviving features are a large stone foundation wall and a massive steel wheel  in diameter.   These are all that remain of what was once Canehill's leading 19th-century industrial facility, which had its origins in the 1830s.  It operated at this site from 1902 into the 1920s.

The site was listed on the National Register of Historic Places in 1982.

See also
National Register of Historic Places listings in Washington County, Arkansas

References

Buildings and structures completed in 1902
National Register of Historic Places in Washington County, Arkansas
Industrial buildings and structures on the National Register of Historic Places in Arkansas
Roadside parks
1902 establishments in Arkansas
Water wheels